Mount Kineo is a prominent geological feature located on a  peninsula that extends from the easterly shore of Moosehead Lake in the northern forest of Maine. With  cliffs rising straight up from the water, it is the central feature of Mount Kineo State Park, a protected area of  managed by the Maine Department of Agriculture, Conservation and Forestry.

History
 Native American
Native Americans once traveled great distances to Mt. Kineo to acquire its rhyolite rock. The mountain is said to contain one of the largest formations of rhyolite in the world. This rhyolite is evidence of an igneous (volcanic) phase although the mountain formations also contain slate and sandstone demonstrating sedimentary and metaphoric history as well. The mechanical properties of the rhyolite on Mount Kineo exhibits the physical properties of flint and was used extensively by indigenous peoples to make arrowheads and implements and thus, has often been referred to as "Kineo flint" in literature; but this term misleads by implication that the rhyolite is a cryptocrystalline form of the mineral quartz derived from a sedimentary origin. The rhyolite is actually an igneous extrusive material implying a volcanic phase that created the unique properties of this highly sought after material. Being the country's largest known mass of this rock, once used by Indigenous people to craft arrowheads, hatchets, chisels, etc., Indigenous implements made from the stone have been found in all parts of New England and even further south, it is evident that various tribes visited Mt. Kineo for centuries to obtain this material.
 Notable visitors
In 1846, Henry David Thoreau visited the Moosehead Lake region, and the mountain's geological formation, Indian relics and traditions deeply interested him. 
 Hotel resort
The first Mt. Kineo House was built on the shores of Moosehead Lake in 1848, but burned in 1868. Rebuilt in 1870 and opened in 1871, the second Mt. Kineo House burned again in 1882. Designed by Arthur H. Vinal, the third Mt. Kineo House opened in 1884.

In 1911, the Maine Central Railroad purchased the resort and engaged the Hiram Ricker Hotel Company to operate it. Then the largest inland waterfront hotel in America, it had accommodations for over 500 guests. In 1933, the railroad eliminated its Kineo branch, and in 1938 sold the hotel. It burned during demolition and the old employee house was burned down in 2018.

Gallery

Features
State park
The state park offers various trails around the peninsula and to the mountain peak. The park can only be reached by water. The Mount Kineo Golf Course operates the seasonal water shuttle service from the public dock in Rockwood to Mount Kineo. The park is 1 of 5 Maine State Parks that are in the path of totality for the 2024 solar eclipse, with 3 minutes and 24 seconds of totality.
Golf course
Mount Kineo Golf Course is believed to be the second oldest in New England. It came under new ownership in 2009. Played on the original 1893 course, the classic lakeside layout has no sand traps, small greens, and the Kineo cliff as a backdrop for the scenic over-the-water par 3 hole #4.

References

External links

Mount Kineo State Park Department of Agriculture, Conservation and Forestry
Moosehead Lake Shoreline Guide & Map Department of Agriculture, Conservation and Forestry

Mountains of Piscataquis County, Maine
Mount Kineo
Mount Kineo
Mount Kineo
Mountains of Maine
State parks of Maine